Cibyra terea is a species of moth of the family Hepialidae. It is known from Panama and Mexico.

References

External links
Hepialidae genera

Hepialidae
Moths of Central America
Moths described in 1892